Florida is a municipality and city in the Camagüey Province of Cuba. The city was established in 1907, and the municipality was established in 1924. Of all the municipalities of the Cuban province of Camagüey, Florida is third in area size. The name is Spanish for Land of flowers.

History
The town was founded in 1907 and, in 1949, the politician Francisco Díaz Marchand presented a project to turn it into an independent municipality. The project did not prosper, but in 1960 Manuel Frías Morales drafted a law to carry out the feasibility studies for the foundation of the municipality, but the opinion was adverse. Later, the Law #30 of June 14, 1971 created the municipality of Florida, one of the youngest of the island.

Geography
The municipality is located northwest of its province, next to the borders with Ciego de Ávila Province. Its elevation is represented by the Urabo Mountain with a height of 132.5 m. The bordering municipalities are Baraguá, Céspedes, Esmeralda, Camagüey and Vertientes.

The municipal territory includes the villages and the localities of Alberto Becerra, Algarrobo, Conquista, El Angel, El Trece, La Alína, La Caridad, La Esperanza, La Jagua, La Porfuerza, La Serafina, La Tomatera, La Vallita, Las Margaritas, Las Mercedes, Las Parras, Las Tusas, Los Güines, María Dos, María Seis, Manzanillo, Ortigal, Otero, Pérez Pérez, Playa Florida, San Antonio, San Diego, San Faustino, San Jerónimo, Santa Gertrudis, Urabo and Vista Alegre. Until the 1977 municipal reform, it included the village of Magarabomba too, currently part of Céspedes.

Demographics
In 2004, the municipality of Florida had a population of 73,612, 53,847 of them in the town proper.

Health 
Florida has 283 doctors, 187 of them are family physicians. There are 125 health facilities, including hospitals (a general and a pediatric one), clinics, pharmacies and laboratories.

Education 
There are 64 educational centers with a total of 15,013 students attending primary, secondary, and pre-university. Florida also offers night schools with a range of educational careers for adults who can not attend during daylight hours.

Culture

Cultural Institutions
Casa de Cultura "Luis Casas Romero"
Biblioteca Pública Municipal "Rubén Martínez Villena"
Biblioteca Pública "Tamara Bunke"
Biblioteca Pública "Ignacio Agramonte"
Florida Municipal Museum
Casa de la Trova "Pedro Loforte Sablón"
Banda Municipal de Concierto
Librería Municipal "América Latina"
Galería de Arte
Centro Literario Municipal
Museo General
Cine Aurora
Sala de Vídeo Comunidad Algarrobo
Sala de Vídeo Comunidad San Antonio
Sala de Vídeo Agramonte
Sala de Vídeo Micro Distrito
Sala de Vídeo del Cementerio

Traditions
 Semana de la Cultura Floridana
 Carnaval Floridano

Transport

Florida is served by the "Central Railway" (Ferrocarril Central) Havana-Santiago, with local and long-distance trains. It is crossed by the national highway "Carretera Central" (CC) and, the future extension of the A1 motorway, will involve the town.

Personalities
Ed Bauta (b. 1930), former baseball player
Calixto Morales Hernández (...–2013), politician and revolutionary
Ada Zayas-Bazán (b. 1958), writer

See also

List of cities in Cuba
Municipalities of Cuba

References

External links

 Camagüey-Florida

 
Cities in Cuba
Populated places in Camagüey Province